Linguistic Aspects of Esperanto (in Esperanto: Lingvistikaj aspektoj de Esperanto) is a book originally written in the Esperanto language. It is based on a study by Professor John C. Wells published by Center for Research and Documentation on World Language Problems (In Esperanto: Centro de Esploro kaj Dokumentado pri la Monda Lingvo-Problemo) in 1978.

It is a scientific, descriptive analysis of Esperanto. The book is also available in German and Danish.

See also 
 The good language
 Esperanto
 John C. Wells

References

External links 
Complete text of the original Esperanto book: http://www.pdf-archive.com/2012/02/07/lingvistikaj-aspektoj-de-esperanto-john-c-wells/

Esperanto